Iván Verebély (Iván Weinberg, 7 December 1937 in Budapest, Hungary – 23 September 2020 in Budapest, Hungary) was a Hungarian actor and comedian. He played in Miskolci Nemzeti Színház, Nemzeti Színház, and in Vidámszínpad.

He appeared in the 2008 film The Boy in the Striped Pyjamas and did voiceover work for Cat City 2. He gave the voice to Mayor Manx for the Hungarian dub of SWAT Kats: The Radical Squadron.

Awards
1972. Jászai Mari Award
2008. Order of the Hungarian Republic Knight Cross (Magyar Köztársasági Érdemrend lovagkeresztje)

References

External links

 

1937 births
2020 deaths
Hungarian male stage actors
Hungarian male voice actors
20th-century Hungarian male actors
21st-century Hungarian male actors
Male actors from Budapest
Hungarian Jews